Keith Christiansen (born 1947 in Seattle, Washington) is an American art historian, curator, and author.  He is the chairman of the department of European paintings at New York City's Metropolitan Museum of Art.

Education
Christiansen did his undergraduate studies at the University of California Santa Cruz where he received his B.A. in history and French literature in 1969.  He remained in California and attended the University of California Los Angeles where he received his Masters of the Arts in 1971. He next received his PhD in art history from Harvard University in Cambridge, Massachusetts in 1977.

Career
Christiansen has been with the Metropolitan Museum since right after his Graduate Studies finished in 1977 and became the John Pope-Hennessy Chairman of the European paintings department at the museum in 2009.  Christiansen has curated and or coordinated  many exhibitions at the museum including: The Age of Caravaggio (1985), The Age of Correggio and the Carracci (1986–87), Caravaggio's Cardsharps Rediscovered (1987), Andrea Mantegna's Descent into Limbo (1988), Painting in Renaissance Siena: 1420–1500 (1988–89), A Caravaggio Rediscovered: The Lute Player (1990), Andrea Mantegna (1992), Jusepe de Ribera (1992), Giambattista Tiepolo (1996–97), From Van Eyck to Bruegel: Early Netherlandish Painting at The Metropolitan Museum of Art (1998–99), Donato Creti: Melancholy and Perfection (1998), Orazio and Artemisia Gentileschi (2001–2002), El Greco (2003–2004), From Filippo Lippi to Piero della Francesca: Fra Carnevale and the Making of a Renaissance Master (2005), Raphael at the Metropolitan: The Colonna Altarpiece (2006), Poussin and Nature (2008), and Michelangelo's First Painting (2009).

2020 controversy
In June 2020 Christiansen ignited a bit of a firestorm including within the ranks of Metropolitan Museum's own staff when he published an Instagram post decrying the destruction of monuments by "zombies". The post was published on Juneteenth and considered by some to be a commentary on certain "Black Lives Matter" protestors.
Therein a letter was sent to the museum's leadership by staff members asking for recognition of "what we see as the expression of a deeply rooted logic of white supremacy and culture of systemic racism at our institution.” 
A day  before the staff letter was sent Christiansen apologized to the European paintings department calling his Instagram post "not only not appropriate and misguided in its judgment but simply wrong.”

Christiansen had uploaded a picture of a pen and ink drawing by the archaeologist Alexandre Lenoir (1769–1831) of his efforts to try to save monuments during the French Revolution and had the caption "Alexandre Lenoir battling the revolutionary zealots bent on destroying the royal tombs in Saint Denis. How many great works of art have been lost to the desire to rid ourselves of a past of which we don’t approve"...

Publications
Christiansen is the co-author with Judith Makn of Orazio and Artemisia Gentileschi (2001) from the Met Publications.

Christiansen edited From Filippo Lippi to Piero della Francesca: Fra Carnevale and the Making of a Renaissance Master (Met publications 2005) as well as contributing an essay to the volume.

He is the co-curator with Carlo Falciani of the 2021 exhibition The Medici
Portraits and Politics, 1512–1570 af the Metropoitan Museum as well as th co-editor (again with Falciani) of the corresponding book from Yale University Press.

He was the co-editor  with Maryan W. Ainsworth of From Van Eyck to Bruegel: Early Netherlandish Painting in The Metropolitan Museum of Art.

References

External links
Metropolitan Medici portrait exhibition curatorial walk-through

1947 births
American art curators
Living people
American writers
American art historians
University of California, Santa Cruz alumni
University of California, Los Angeles alumni
Harvard Graduate School of Arts and Sciences alumni
People from Seattle
Metropolitan Museum of Art
Historians from Washington (state)